Nate Miller (born August 3, 1963) was an American professional boxer who competed from 1986 to 2001.

Professional career
He turned pro in 1986 and in 1994 landed a shot at IBF Cruiserweight Title holder Alfred Cole, but lost a decision. In 1995 he scored a KO victory over Orlin Norris to win the WBA Cruiserweight Title, and defended the title four times before losing the belt to Fabrice Tiozzo in 1997. He retired in 2001 after losses to Norris, Thomas Hearns, and Vincenzo Rossitto.

Professional boxing record

See also 
 List of WBA world champions

References

External links 
 

1963 births
Cruiserweight boxers
Living people
World boxing champions
American male boxers
Boxers from Philadelphia